Deokali Canal is one of the largest canals located in Ghazipur district of Uttar Pradesh, India. The cost of making the canal was 2.9 carore in 1978.

References 

Canals in Andhra Pradesh